Enshi Xujiaping Airport  is an airport serving Enshi City, Hubei province, China.

The airport is located in the valley of the Qing River, a few kilometers north of the downtown Enshi City. It is situated close to, but not connected to, Enshi railway station.

Airlines and destinations

See also
List of airports in China

References

Airports in Hubei